Assyrians in Israel and Palestine are Assyrians living in either the State of Israel or the State of Palestine, totaling approximately 4,500 individuals as of 2022.

History
The Assyrian presence in the Israel mainly originated from those who fled the Assyrian genocide from Tur Abdin in 1915. Many found refuge in what was known as the "Syriac Quarter" in Bethlehem and the since destroyed "Syriac Quarter" in the Old City of Jerusalem, squeezed between the Armenian Quarter and the Jewish Quarter at the Old City’s southern end.

After the Israel-Arab War of 1967, the hundreds of Syriacs who inhabited the Old City of Jerusalem had their homes taken over by Israeli authorities and were scheduled to be handed over to Jewish settlers or else demolished to make way for housing exclusively built for Jews. It is estimated that 65% of Syriacs who inhabited the Holy Land at the beginning of 1967 left the city in the following years.

The Assyrians in the Holy Land today mostly live in the cities of Jerusalem and Bethlehem.

Religion

Assyrians are predominantly Christians of the East and West Syriac Rite. The majority of Assyrians in Israel are adherents of the Syriac Orthodox Church.

Catholic Assyrians

Syriac Catholic Church

The Syriac Catholic Church has a Patriarchal Exarchate formed in 1892 and is based out of the Church of Saint Thomas in Jerusalem. As of 2015, there are 3 parishes in Israel with an estimated 3,000 adherents.

Chaldean Catholic Church

Since 1903, the Chaldean Catholic Church has been represented in Jerusalem by a non-resident patriarchal vicar. In 1997, the Chaldean Catholic Church established the Territory Dependent on the Patriarch which was previously governed as the Patriarchal Vicariate of Jerusalem within the Patriarch's own archeparchy.

Orthodox Assyrians

Syriac Orthodox Church

The Syriac Orthodox Church is the largest Assyrian church in Israel, covered by the Archbishopric of Israel, Palestine and Jordan under the spiritual guidance and direction of Archbishop Gabriel Dahho. 

The most notable monastery in Israel is the Monastery of Saint Mark in Jerusalem. The Syriac Orthodox Church also has sharing rights to the Church of the Holy Sepulchre and minor rights to the Tomb of the Virgin Mary where they possess an altar on the western side of the holy site.

See also
Christianity in Israel
Assyrian homeland

References

Further reading
Sedan, Gil. "Assyrian community speaks Aramaic, provides a warm welcome to Israelis." Jewish Telegraphic Agency, February 27, 2003.
Sedan, Gil. "Jews and Arabs work separately to preserve Aramaic." Jewish Telegraphic Agency, August 30, 2002.
Sun, John Russel. "Assyrians along with other Christians celebrated Easter in Jerusalem." AFP, April 8, 2007.

External links
Jewish Virtual Library - Christian Communities in Israel
Israeli Ministry of Foreign Affairs site on Christian communities
Invisible Christians of the Holy Land

 
Assyrian ethnic groups
Ethnic groups in Israel
Ethnic groups in the State of Palestine
Middle Eastern diaspora in Israel
 
Assyrian diaspora